SS Edward R. Squibb was a Liberty ship built in the United States during World War II. She was named after Edward R. Squibb, a US Navy surgeon, and founder of E. R. Squibb and Sons.

Construction
Edward R. Squibb was laid down on 6 October 1944, under a Maritime Commission (MARCOM) contract, MC hull 2384, by J.A. Jones Construction, Brunswick, Georgia; she was sponsored by Mrs. Paul Jones, daughter-in-law of James Addison Jones, and launched on 9 November 1944.

History
She was allocated to West India Steamship Company, on 21 November 1944. On 30 October 1948, she was laid up in the National Defense Reserve Fleet, in Beaumont, Texas. On 13 April 1971, she was sold for $40,100, to Luria Brothers & Co., Inc., for scrapping. She was removed from the fleet on 11 May 1971.

References

Bibliography

 
 
 
 
 

 

Liberty ships
Ships built in Brunswick, Georgia
1944 ships
Beaumont Reserve Fleet